Matthew Egan (born 10 July 1983) is a former Australian rules footballer who played for the Geelong Football Club in the Australian Football League (AFL). He served as interim senior coach at the Essendon Football Club after the resignation of James Hird for the final three rounds of the 2015 season. He served as head of development at the Melbourne Football Club from September 2016 until 2020.

AFL career
Egan took up football in his late teens after having been a promising junior tennis player, having once been ranked fifth for juniors in Victoria. As a sentiment to this he is known for his trademark "Forehand punch" as he swings it like a tennis Forehand. Geelong drafted him with their final pick in the 2004 National Draft, after he had played in the VFL with the reserves and was named Geelong's best first-year player for 2005.

He was a tall centre half-back, who often shut down some of the opposition's top forwards, including Nick Riewoldt, Barry Hall, Matthew Lloyd, Fraser Gehrig, Jonathan Brown, Matthew Pavlich and Quinten Lynch amongst others.

Egan had a spectacular third season in the AFL, playing 22 matches, with 257 disposals, achieving several honours such as All-Australian selection, and celebrated his 50th AFL game with a win over the Sydney Swans, even though he did only manage nine disposals.

Round 14 saw a 50-point win over Essendon, with 12 disposals, and receiving an Army Award nomination for a courageous goal-saving, diving smother. He was declared the round's winner with 44% of the public vote, but ultimately lost out in the selection of the final shortlist of the year's weekly winners.

Against the Brisbane Lions in Round 22, Egan fractured the navicular bone in his right foot during a marking contest with Jonathan Brown, requiring emergency surgery to insert screws into his foot. This injury saw Egan forced out of the finals, missing both the AFL and VFL's victorious premiership sides.

Egan capped off an excellent season with selection in the 2007 All-Australian Team as the Centre Half-Back in a squad that contained nine Geelong players. He was also named Geelong's Best Clubman for 2007.

In November 2008, Geelong admitted it was unlikely that Egan would play AFL again, as a result of the foot injury he sustained in 2007.

On 26 August 2009, Geelong announced that they would delist Egan, but that they remained hopeful he would play again in the AFL and they also retired the number 19 for season 2010 in honour of Egan. He worked that year as an assistant coach at the Cats VFL team and continued to work for the club as an assistant in 2010.

Statistics

|-
|- style="background-color: #EAEAEA"
! scope="row" style="text-align:center" | 2005
|style="text-align:center;"|
| 19 || 15 || 0 || 1 || 67 || 65 || 132 || 49 || 8 || 0.0 || 0.1 || 4.5 || 4.3 || 8.8 || 3.3 || 0.5
|-
! scope="row" style="text-align:center" | 2006
|style="text-align:center;"|
| 19 || 22 || 1 || 0 || 102 || 130 || 232 || 82 || 31 || 0.0 || 0.0 || 4.6 || 5.9 || 10.5 || 3.7 || 1.4
|- style="background-color: #EAEAEA"
! scope="row" style="text-align:center" | 2007
|style="text-align:center;"|
| 19 || 22 || 0 || 0 || 115 || 142 || 257 || 80 || 29 || 0.0 || 0.0 || 5.2 || 6.5 || 11.7 || 3.6 || 1.3
|-
! scope="row" style="text-align:center" | 2008
|style="text-align:center;"|
| 19 || 0 || — || — || — || — || — || — || — || — || — || — || — || — || — || —
|- style="background-color: #EAEAEA"
! scope="row" style="text-align:center" | 2009
|style="text-align:center;"|
| 19 || 0 || — || — || — || — || — || — || — || — || — || — || — || — || — || —
|- class="sortbottom"
! colspan=3| Career
! 59
! 1
! 1
! 284
! 337
! 621
! 211
! 68
! 0.0
! 0.0
! 4.8
! 5.7
! 10.5
! 3.6
! 1.2
|}

References

External links

1983 births
Living people
Geelong Football Club players
Essendon Football Club coaches
All-Australians (AFL)
Australian rules footballers from Victoria (Australia)